Francesca Snell, also known as Francesca Painter-Snell, (born 28 March 1987) is a New Zealand and British water polo player. She competed for the New Zealand women's national water polo team at the 2007 World Aquatics Championships and for Great Britain in the women's tournament at the 2012 Summer Olympics. This was the first ever Olympic GB women's water polo team.

She is a member of the West London Penguin Swimming and Water Polo Club.

References

British female water polo players
Olympic water polo players of Great Britain
Water polo players at the 2012 Summer Olympics
1987 births
Living people
New Zealand female water polo players